Don't Take Away My Heart is a song by German musical group Modern Talking. It was released in May 2000 as the second and final single from their ninth album, Year of the Dragon.

Track listing 
CD-Maxi Hansa 74321 75448 2 (BMG) / EAN 0743217544829 02.05.2000
 "Don't Take Away My Heart" (New Vocal Version) - 3:54
 "Don't Take Away My Heart" (Rap Version) - 3:26
 "Fly To The Moon" (Rap Version) - 3:07
 "Modern Talking Megamix 2000" - 5:15

Charts

References 

Modern Talking songs
2000 singles
Eurodance songs
Songs written by Dieter Bohlen
1999 songs
Ariola Records singles